The Ministry of Transport and Communications of Peru is the government ministry responsible for regulating transportation and communications services. It is headquartered in Lima. , the minister of transport and communications is Paola Lazarte.

Functions
The key function of the Ministry is to develop, standardize, and implement transportation- and communication-related policies. This includes plans for national sectoral development and managing licenses, permits, and concessions. The Ministry works to plan, promote, and manage the delivery of public services in accordance with relevant laws. It supervises the enforcement of laws while operating constituent entities like decentralized public bodies and multi-sectoral committees.

Subordinate agencies

General Directorate of Regulation and International Affairs Communications

The General Directorate for Regulatory Affairs and International Communication (GDRAIC) is the organ of the national line Subsector Communications Manager that proposes and evaluates policies and regulations aimed to promote the sustainable development of services of communications and their universal access. Its regular functions include:

 Communications sector policy proposals, including telecommunications and postal services
 Recommending a Institutional Strategic Plan Subsector in coordination with the General Office of Planning and Budget.
 Drafting telecommunications- and postal-related rules and regulations, including the National Telecommunications Plan
 Developing environmental standards in tandem with other agencies
 Coordinating with the International Telecommunication Union, Universal Postal Union, and other international organizations
 Analyzing the state of the market of telecommunications and postal services
 Studying emerging technologies, numbering, signaling, and frequency allocation to accommodate regulations
 Publishing statistics on communications services
 Managing and administering public use infrastructure, including the Postal and Philatelic Museum of Peru
 Creating plans and programs to promote philatelic activity in Peru
 Proposing the terms and conditions for the conduct of public procurement of telecom services

Commission for the Investigation of Aviation Accidents 

The Commission for the Investigation of Aviation Accidents ( (CIAA)) is the department that serves as the aviation accident and incident investigation authority. Notable investigations by the CIAA include TANS Perú Flight 204 and TANS Perú Flight 222.

References

External links

 Ministry of Transport and Communications 

Transportation and Communications
Peru
Peru
Organizations investigating aviation accidents and incidents
Transport organisations based in Peru
Ministries established in 1897
1897 establishments in Peru